is a district located in Niigata Prefecture, Japan.

As of July 1, 2019, the district has a population of 9,218 and a density of 54.2 persons per km2. The area is now 170.21 km2.

Towns and villages
The district consists of one village:

 Tsunan

History

 In 1954 - The town of Tōkamachi gained city status after merging with three villages and later gained more land by merging surrounding villages. There were some villages from the northside of the district that were merged into the city of Ojiya.

Recent mergers
 On April 1, 2005 - The town of Kawanishi, and the village of Nakasato were merged into the expanded city of Tōkamachi.

External links
 十日町広域圏合併協議会

Districts in Niigata Prefecture